József Vágó (30 June 1906 – 26 August 1945) was a Hungarian football defender who played for Hungary in the 1934 FIFA World Cup. He also played for Debreceni VSC.

References

External links
 FIFA profile

Sportspeople from Debrecen 
Hungarian footballers
Hungary international footballers
Association football defenders
Debreceni VSC players
1934 FIFA World Cup players
1906 births
1945 deaths